Brithopus is an extinct genus of dinocephalian therapsids. It contains a single species, Brithopus priscus, known from fragmentary remains found in the Copper
Sandstones near Isheevo, Russia.

Description
Brithopus was fairly large, reaching a length of 2.5–3 m (8–10 ft). The skull was similar to Titanophoneus, but more massive and heavily built.

Classification
B. priscus was first named in 1838 and was traditionally classified in the Anteosauria, a group of carnivorous dinocephalians. Brithopus served as the basis for the family Brithopodidae, which once included many anteosaurian species. Because it is based on fragmentary material, Brithopus is regarded as a nomen dubium by some researchers. Brithopus was later considered a possible estemmenosuchid, a type of herbivorous tapinocephalian therapsid.

Dinosaurus and Eurosaurus have both been considered synonyms of Brithopus.

See also
 List of therapsids

References

External links
 Message to the Dinosaur Mailing List briefly detailing the history of the name

 Tapinocephalians
 Prehistoric therapsid genera
 Monotypic prehistoric animal genera
 Fossils of Russia
 Fossil taxa described in 1838